The coronary ligaments of the knee (also known as meniscotibial ligaments) are portions of the joint capsule which connect the inferior edges of the fibrocartilaginous menisci to the periphery of the tibial plateaus.

Structure
The coronary ligaments of the knee are continuous with the joint capsule and the menisci.

Function
The coronary ligaments function to connect parts of the outside, inferior edges of the medial and lateral menisci to the joint capsule of the knee.

The medial meniscus also has firm attachments laterally to the intercondylar area of the tibia and medially to the tibial collateral ligament.

The lateral meniscus has firm attachments medially to the intercondylar area via the ends of the meniscus, and posteromedially via the posterior meniscofemoral ligament, which attaches the posterior limb of the meniscus to the posterior cruciate ligament and medial femoral condyle. The lateral meniscus is not directly connected to the fibular collateral ligament, and is thus more movable than the medial meniscus.

Additional images

References/External links
 Gray, Henry. Anatomy of the Human Body. Philadelphia: Lea & Febiger, 1918; Bartleby.com, 2000. 7b. The Knee.
 Moore, Keith L. and Arthur F. Dalley.  Clinically Oriented Anatomy, 5th ed. (2006) p688-693. 
 Lateral Meniscus - Wheeless' Textbook of Orthopaedics
 Medial Meniscus - Wheeless' Textbook of Orthopaedics

References 

Knee ligaments